Power cycling is the act of turning a piece of equipment, usually a computer, off and then on again. Reasons for power cycling include having an electronic device reinitialize its set of configuration parameters or recover from an unresponsive state of its mission critical functionality, such as in a crash or hang situation. Power cycling can also be used to reset network activity inside a modem. It can also be among the first steps for troubleshooting an issue.

Overview
Power cycling can be done manually, usually using a switch on the device to be cycled; automatically, through some type of device, system, or network management monitoring and control; or by remote control; through a communication channel.

In the data center environment, remote control power cycling can usually be done through a power distribution unit, over TCP/IP. In the home environment, this can be done through home automation powerline communications or IP protocols. Most Internet Service Providers publish a "how-to" on their website showing their customers the correct procedure to power cycle their devices.

Power cycling is a standard diagnostic procedure usually performed first when the computer freezes. However, frequently power cycling a computer can cause thermal stress. Reset has an equal effect on the software but may be less problematic for the hardware as power is not interrupted.

Historical uses
On all Apollo missions to the moon, the landing radar was required to acquire the surface before a landing could be attempted.  But on Apollo 14, the landing radar was unable to lock on.  Mission control told the astronauts to cycle the power.  They did, the radar locked on just in time, and the landing was completed.

During the Rosetta mission to comet 67P/Churyumov–Gerasimenko, the Philae lander did not return the expected telemetry on awakening after arrival at the comet.  The problem was diagnosed as "somehow a glitch in the electronics",  engineers cycled the power, and the lander awoke correctly.

During the launch of the billion dollar AEHF-6 satellite on 26 March 2020 by an Atlas V rocket from Cape Canaveral Air Force Station, a hold was called at T-46 seconds due to hydraulic system not responding as expected.  The launch crew turned it off and back on, and the launch proceeded normally.

In 2023 the Interstellar Boundary Explorer spacecraft stopped responding to commands after an anomaly.  When gentler techniques failed, NASA resorted to rebooting the spacecraft with the remote equivalent of a power cycle.

See also 
Energy conservation
Hard reboot

References

Electric power distribution
Out-of-band management
Computer hardware